Milton Goldstein may refer to:

 Milton Goldstein (film executive) (born 1926), American film executive
 Milton Goldstein (photographer) (1915–2000), Jewish American author and photographer